The  was the air arm of the Imperial Japanese Navy (IJN). The organization was responsible for the operation of naval aircraft and the conduct of aerial warfare in the Pacific War.

The Japanese military acquired their first aircraft in 1910 and followed the development of air combat during World War I with great interest. They initially procured European aircraft but quickly built their own and launched themselves onto an ambitious aircraft carrier building program. They launched the world's first purpose-built aircraft carrier, in 1922. Afterwards they embarked on a conversion program of several excess battlecruisers and battleships into aircraft carriers. The IJN Air Service had the mission of national air defence, deep strike, naval warfare, and so forth. It retained this mission to the end.

The Japanese pilot training program was very selective and rigorous, producing a high-quality and long-serving pilot corps, who were very successful in the air during the early part of World War II in the Pacific. However, the long duration of the training program, combined with a shortage of gasoline for training, did not allow the IJN to rapidly provide qualified replacements in sufficient numbers. Moreover, Japan, unlike the U.S. or Britain, never altered its program to speed up the training process of its recruits. The resultant decrease in quantity and quality, among other factors, resulted in increasing casualties toward the end of the war.

Japanese navy aviators, like their army counterparts, preferred maneuverable aircraft, leading to lightly built but extraordinarily agile types, most famously the A6M Zero, which achieved its feats by sacrificing armor and self-sealing fuel tanks. Aircraft with armor and self-sealing fuel tanks, such as the Kawanishi N1K-J would not enter service until late 1944–1945, which was too late to have a meaningful impact. The Imperial Japanese Navy Air Service was equal in function to the Royal Navy's Fleet Air Arm (FAA).

Early history

Origins

The beginnings of Japanese naval aviation were established in 1912, with the creation of a Commission on Naval Aeronautical Research (Kaigun Kokūjutsu Kenkyūkai) under the authority of the Technical Department. The commission was charged with the promotion of aviation technology and training for the navy. Initially was focus was in non-rigid airships but it quickly moved on to the development of winged and powered aircraft. That year, the commission decided to purchase foreign winged aircraft and to send junior officers abroad to learn how to fly and maintain them. The navy purchased two seaplanes from the Glenn Curtiss factory in Hammondsport, New York, and two Maurice Farman seaplanes from France. To establish a cadre of naval aviators and technicians, the navy also dispatched three officers to Hammondsport and two to France for training and instruction. After their return to Japan at the end of 1912, two of the newly trained naval aviators made the first flights at Oppama on Yokosuka Bay, one in a Curtiss seaplane, the other in a Maurice Farman.

In 1912, the Royal Navy had also informally established its own flying branch, the Royal Naval Air Service. The Japanese admirals, whose own Navy had been modeled on the Royal Navy and whom they admired, themselves proposed their own Naval Air Service. The Japanese Navy had also observed technical developments in other countries and saw that the airplane had potential. Within a year, the Imperial Japanese navy had begun the operational use of aircraft. In 1913, the following year, a Navy transport ship, Wakamiya Maru was converted into a seaplane carrier capable of carrying two assembled and two disassembled seaplanes. Wakamiya also participated in the naval maneuvers off Sasebo that year.

Siege of Tsingtao

On 23 August 1914, as a result of its treaty with Great Britain, Japan declared war on Germany. The Japanese, together with a token British force, blockaded then laid siege to the German colony of Kiaochow and its administrative capital Tsingtao on the Shandong peninsula. During the siege, starting from September, four Maurice Farman seaplanes (two active and two reserve) on board  conducted reconnaissance and aerial bombardments on German positions and ships. The aircraft had crude bombsights and carried six to ten bombs that had been converted from shells, and were released through metal tubes on each side of the cockpit. On 5 September, during the first successful operation, two Farman seaplanes dropped several bombs on the Bismarck battery, the main German fortifications in Tsingtao. The bombs landed harmlessly in the mud, but the aircraft were able to confirm that  was not at Tsingtao; this was intelligence of major importance to Allied naval command. On 30 September Wakamiya was damaged by a mine and later sent back to Japan for repairs. But the seaplanes, by transferring on to the shore, continued to be used against the German defenders until their surrender on 7 November 1914. Wakamiya conducted the world's first naval-launched aerial raids in history and was in effect the first aircraft carrier of the Imperial Japanese Navy. By the end of the siege the aircraft had conducted 50 sorties and dropped 200 bombs, although damage to German defenses was light.

Further developments (1916–1918)
In 1916, the Commission on Naval Aeronautical Research was disbanded and the funds supporting it were reallocated for the establishment of three naval air units (hikotai) which would fall under the authority of the Naval Affairs Bureau of the Navy Ministry. The first unit was established at Yokosuka in April 1916, however, the lack of a specific naval air policy in these early years was made apparent by the fact that the Yokosuka Air Group operated with the fleet only once a year when it was transported briefly to whatever training area the IJN was then using for maneuvers. Japanese naval aviation, though, continued to make progress. In 1917, officers at the Yokosuka Naval Arsenal designed and built the first Japanese seaplane, the Ro-Go Ko-gata reconnaissance seaplane, which was much more useful at sea and much safer than the Maurice Farman aircraft that the navy had been using up to that point. The aircraft was eventually mass-produced and became the mainstay of the navy's air arm until the mid-1920s. Japanese factories by the end of the war, in increasing numbers, were beginning to turn out engines and fuselages based on foreign designs.  A major expansion in Japanese naval air strength was part of the 1918 naval expansion program which made possible a new air group and a naval air station at Sasebo. In 1918, the IJN secured land around Lake Kasumigaura in Ibaraki Prefecture, northeast of Tokyo. The following year, a naval air station for both land and sea aircraft was established, and subsequently, naval air training was transferred to Kasumigaura, from Yokosuka. After the establishment of a naval air training unit at Kasumigaura, the air station became the principal flight training center for the navy.

Interwar development

Sempill mission

The Japanese navy had closely monitored the progress of aviation of the three Allied naval powers during World War I and concluded that Britain had made the greatest advances in naval aviation. They had also learned a good deal about naval aviation through their contacts within the Royal Navy. In 1921, the Japanese government formally requested that the British dispatch a naval air mission, in order to develop and to provide a professional edge to Japanese naval aviation. There were reservations on the part of the Admiralty, about granting the Japanese unrestricted access to British technology. Despite this the British government sent an unofficial civil aviation mission to Japan.

The Sempill Mission  led by Captain William Forbes-Sempill, a former officer in the Royal Air Force experienced in the design and testing of Royal Navy aircraft during the First World War. The mission consisted of 27 members, who were largely personnel with experience in naval aviation and included pilots and engineers from several British aircraft manufacturing firms. The British technical mission left for Japan in September with the objective of helping the Imperial Japanese Navy develop and improve the proficiency of its naval air arm. The British government also hoped it would lead to a lucrative arms deal. The mission arrived at Kasumigaura Naval Air Station the following month, in November 1921, and stayed in Japan for 18 months.

The Japanese were trained on several British aircraft such as the Gloster Sparrowhawk; as the mission also brought to Kasumigaura well over a hundred aircraft comprising twenty different models, five of which were then currently in service with the Royal Air Force, including the Sparrowhawk. These planes eventually provided the inspiration for the design of a number of Japanese naval aircraft. Technicians became familiar with the newest aerial weapons and equipment - torpedoes, bombs, machine guns, cameras, and communications gear. Naval aviators were trained in various techniques such as torpedo bombing, flight control and carrier landing and take-offs; skills that would later be employed in the shallow waters of Pearl Harbor in December 1941. The mission also brought the plans of the most recent British aircraft carriers, such as HMS Argus and HMS Hermes, which influenced the final stages of the development of the carrier Hōshō. By the time the last members of the mission had returned to Britain, the Japanese had acquired a reasonable grasp of the latest aviation technology and the Sempill mission of 1921–22 marked the true beginning of an effective Japanese naval air force. Japanese naval aviation also, both in technology and in doctrine, continued to be dependent on the British model for most of the 1920s.

The military in Japan were also aided in their quest to build up their naval forces by Sempill himself, who had become a Japanese spy. Over the next 20 years, the British Peer provided the Japanese with secret information on the latest British aviation technology. His espionage work helped Japan rapidly develop its military aircraft and its technologies before the Second World War.

Carrier aviation

Japanese interest in the potential of carrier operations demonstrated by the observations on board  led to the inclusion of an aircraft carrier in the eight-eight fleet program of 1918. The 7,470-ton  was laid down in December 1919 at Yokohama. Hōshō was the second warship after the British  to be designed from the keel up as an aircraft carrier and the first one to be completed as from the keel up.

In the 1920s, the larger percentage of aircraft that were initially acquired and inducted into service were land based seaplanes whose main tasks were reconnaissance and anti-submarine patrols. The Japanese had drawn up plans for the formation of 17 squadrons of these aircraft, but budgetary constraints limited the units to eleven until 1931. However, Amagi was damaged during the Great Kanto earthquake in 1923 and  became a replacement. Akagi was completed in 1927 while Kaga completed a year later. With these two carriers much of Imperial Japanese Navy's doctrines and operating procedures were established.

When Hōshō was completed, little thought was given to naval aircraft in an offensive role and moreover with only one carrier there was insufficient consideration given to carrier doctrine within the Japanese naval establishment. However, in 1928 the First Carrier Division was formed with three carriers and the study of the role of aircraft carriers in a naval engagement was initiated. Because of the short range of carrier aircraft at the time, many in the naval hierarchy were still very much surface oriented. They viewed carrier aircraft to be employed as support for the main battle fleet and not as offensive weapons. Aircraft were to act as scouts and spotters, layers of smoke screens for naval gunfire, fleet air defense, and later (with the increase in aircraft performance) as a means to attack battleships and other surface targets.

Naval aviators however, had a different perspective. Believing that a major aerial engagement to clear the space over the opposing fleets would precede the final surface battle, they increasingly considered the enemy's carriers as the main targets of naval air power. Hence, in the early 1930s, the Imperial Japanese Navy adhered to no unified doctrine as to how carriers would be utilized in a fleet action and had no clear vision as to the role of air power in naval warfare. But with the continued increase in the range and power of aircraft, carriers became acknowledged for their ability to strike at targets beyond the range of surface guns and torpedoes.  Including gunnery staffs as well as naval aviators, the IJN became convinced that carrier aircraft should be used for a preemptive strike against the enemy's carriers to achieve air superiority in the proximity of the surface battle. Around 1932–33, the IJN began to shift its aerial focus from targeting the enemy's battleships to their aircraft carriers; and by the mid-30s, with the improved performance of bombing aircraft and particularly dive-bombers, the destruction of the enemy's carrier force became the primary focus of Japan's carrier forces. The emerging concept of a mass aerial attack also shifted the emphasis away from the protection of the main battle fleet to attacks on targets over the horizon. Essential to the implementation of such a tactic was the locating of the enemy before the enemy found the Japanese carriers. As a consequence, it was important to the Japanese that naval aircraft be able to "outrange the enemy" in the air, just as Japanese surface forces could do by naval gunnery and torpedo attacks. Subsequently, throughout the 1930s, Japanese naval aviation emphasized range in its specifications for new aircraft.

Land-based air groups

In addition to developing carrier-based aviation, the IJN maintained many land-based air groups. In the early 1930s, the Japanese created a new category of aircraft termed rikujo kogeki-ki (land based attack aircraft) or Rikko for short. This was in keeping with the strategy of providing a rapid defense of the home islands against the possible westward advance of an American naval offensive across the Pacific. Land-based aircraft actually provided the bulk of Japanese naval aviation up to the eve of the Pacific War. In this regard, Japan was unique among the three major naval powers during the interwar period and the immediate prewar years with only the two air wings of the US Marine Corps being analogous to Japan's land based naval air units. The creation of these air units had begun at the end of World War I, when plans had been drawn up for 17 of them, however these plans were not fully implemented until 1931. They were to be located at six air stations around the Japanese home islands: Yokosuka, Sasebo, Kasumigaura, Omura, Tateyama, and Kure. These units were composed of various types of aircraft which were mostly seaplanes. In absolute numbers, land-based aircraft provided the largest growth in Japaneses naval air power in the years before the Pacific War. The Circle One naval expansion program which had been formulated in 1927 and put into effect in 1931 called for the creation of 28 new air groups. Although only 14 groups were actually established by 1934, which was a response to American naval expansion under the first Vinson plan, the Circle Two program called for eight additional air groups to be created by the end of 1937. They were to operate out of six new air stations at Ōminato, Saeki, Yokohama, Maizuru, Kanoya, and Kisarazu in the home islands and Chinhae on the southern coast of Korea. Under the pressure of the second Vinson plan, initiated by the United States, the Japanese increased the momentum in building up their land-based air forces. The deadline for completion date of the aviation of the Circle One expansion moved up to 1937 and an all-out effort was also made to complete the aircraft production of the Circle Two program by the end of the same year.

By the end of 1937, the navy possessed 563 land-based aircraft, in addition to the 332 aircraft aboard its carrier fleet. The navy air service had a total of 895 aircraft and 2,711 aircrew, including pilots and navigators, in thirty-nine air groups. Although, this total 895 aircraft was considerably less than total American naval air strength for the same period, Japan's land based aviation force was substantially larger. The substantial land-based air power worked to Japan's advantage when the nation went to war in 1937 with China.

Expansion (1931–1937)

By 1927 Japanese naval aviation had grown sufficiently in size and complexity that it was necessary to consolidate the administrative organization of the air service. The various air operations and activities during peacetime, which were divided between the Navy Ministry and the Navy Technical Department, were now merged into a single Naval Aviation Department. In 1932, an independent Naval Air Arsenal was also established to streamline the testing and development of aircraft and weaponry. During their early years, these organizations were under the command of able air enthusiasts, who played a major role in the rapid expansion of Japanese naval aviation during the following decade. The London Naval Treaty of 1930 had imposed new limitations on warship construction, which caused the Navy General Staff to view naval aviation as a way to make up for the shortcomings in the surface fleet.

In 1931, the air service pushed for and established the remainder of the 17 air squadrons that had been projected in the 1923 expansion plans. These were eventually combined into six air groups (kokutai) located at six bases around Japan. Furthermore, the Circle naval expansion programs featured an additional 12 air groups. They also included the development of specific aviation technologies and the acceleration of air crew training. The Circle One plan concentrated on developing new aircraft types, including large flying boats and land-based attack aircraft, as well as the building of seaborne units, both floatplanes and carrier aircraft. The Circle Two plan continued the buildup in naval aircraft and authorized the construction of two aircraft carriers.

Shanghai incident (1932)
In January 1932, clashes between Chinese and Japanese forces occurred in Shanghai. On 29 January, several aircraft from the seaplane tender Notoro, anchored in the Yangtze river, carried out low-level attacks on Chinese military positions in Zhabei, on artillery positions outside the city and on an armored train at a railway station in the northern part of the city. There were heavy civilian casualties and property losses, partly as a result of crude bombing techniques and mechanisms at the time. The Third Fleet consisting of the First Carrier Division with the carriers  Kaga and  Hōshō was also dispatched to the city. Kaga arrived off the entrance of the Yangtze River on 1 February, and was joined by Hōshō two days later. On board Hōshō were ten fighters and nine torpedo bombers, while Kaga had 16 fighters and 32 torpedo bombers. Altogether, the Japanese had eighty aircraft that could be deployed over Shanghai, mostly Nakajima A1N2 fighters and Mitsubishi B1M3 torpedo bombers. On 3 February, a number of the aircraft from the two carriers were deployed to Kunda Airfield, where they flew missions in support of Japanese ground forces.

Aircraft from Hōshō participated in the IJN's first aerial combat on 5 February, when three fighters escorting two bombers were engaged by nine Chinese fighters over Zhenru; one Chinese fighter was damaged. On 22 February, while escorting three B1M3 torpedo bombers, three fighters from Kaga operating from Kunda Airfield scored the IJN's first aerial victory when they shot down a Boeing 218 fighter, flown by an American volunteer pilot Robert Short. After gaining intelligence that the Chinese were planning to mount a counteroffensive, the Japanese bombers carried out attacks on Chinese airfields at Hangzhou and Suzhou between 23 and 26 February, destroying a number of aircraft on the ground. On 26 February, six A1N2 fighters from Hōshō, while escorting nine bombers from Kaga on a bombing raid on an airfield at Hangzhou, engaged five Chinese aircraft and shot down three of them. The Japanese carriers returned to home waters after a cease-fire had been declared on 3 March. Aircrews of Kaga received a special commendation from the commander of the Third Fleet, Vice Admiral Kichisaburō Nomura, for their actions.

The actions of the Japanese aviators over Shanghai represented the first significant air operations over East Asia and for the IJN it also marked the first combat operations from its aircraft carriers. The attack on Zhabei was also the most destructive aerial attack on an urban area until the Condor Legion's attack on Guernica, five years later. Although perceived as insignificant skirmishes, the resulting aerial campaign led to several conclusions: though the A1N2 fighter proved to be inferior in performance to the Boeing 218, the campaign had demonstrated the above average flying skills of the IJN's pilots and the relative precision of its bombing techniques during clear weather.

China War (1937–1941)

From the onset of hostilities in 1937 until forces were diverted to combat for the Pacific war in 1941, naval aircraft played a key role in military operations on the Chinese mainland. The IJN had two primary responsibilities: the first was to support of amphibious operations on the Chinese coast and the second was the strategic aerial bombardment of Chinese cities. This was unique in naval history, as it was the first time that any naval air service had ever carried out such an effort. The campaign initially began in 1937, taking place largely in the Yangtze River basin with attacks on military installations along the Chinese coast by Japanese carrier aircraft. Naval involvement reached its peak in 1938–39 with the ferocious bombardment of cities deep in the Chinese interior by land-based medium bombers and concluded during 1941 with an attempt by tactical aircraft, both carrier and land-based, to cut communication and transportation routes in southern China. Although, the 1937–41 air offensives failed in its political and psychological aims, it did reduce the flow of strategic materiel to China and for a time, improved the Japanese military situation in the central and southern parts of the country. The China War was of great importance and value to the Japanese naval aviation in demonstrating how aircraft could contribute to the projection of naval power ashore.

Despite the fierce rivalry between the military branches, in the fall of 1937 General Matsui Iwane, the Army general in command of the theater, admitted the superiority of the Naval Air Services. His combat troops relied on the Navy for air support. Naval bombers such as the Mitsubishi G3M and Mitsubishi G4M were used to bomb Chinese cities. Japanese fighter planes, notably the Mitsubishi Zero, gained tactical air superiority; control of the skies over China belonged to the Japanese. Unlike other naval airforces, the IJNAS was responsible for strategic bombing and operated long ranged bombers.

The Japanese strategic bombing was mostly done against Chinese big cities, such as Shanghai, Wuhan and Chonging, with around 5,000 raids from February 1938 to August 1943.

The bombing of Nanjing and Guangzhou, which began on 22 and 23 September 1937, called forth widespread protests culminating in a resolution by the Far Eastern Advisory Committee of the League of Nations. Lord Cranborne, the British Under-Secretary of State For Foreign Affairs, expressed his indignation in his own declaration.

Pacific war

At the beginning of the Pacific war the Imperial Japanese Navy possessed the most powerful carrier force in the world, through combination of excellent ships, well-designed aircraft, and unsurpassed aviators.
The Navy Air Service consisted of five naval air fleets. The Japanese had a total of ten aircraft carriers: six fleet carriers, three smaller carriers, and one training carrier. The 11th Air Fleet: contained most of the Navy's land based strike aircraft. One important advantage exercised by the Japanese at the start of the war was their ability to mass carrier air power. In April 1941 the First Air Fleet was created, concentrating the Navy's carriers into a single powerful striking unit. The Kido Butai (Mobile Unit/Force) was the First Air Fleet's operational component. At the start of the war, three carrier divisions made up the Kido Butai. Unlike in the United States Navy where carrier divisions served only in an administrative capacity, the carrier divisions of the Kido Butai were operational entities. The two carriers in a division fought together, often exchanging aircraft squadrons and commanders on strikes. The commander of the Kido Butai could wield the aircraft of its three divisions as a single entity bringing masses of aircraft crewed by highly trained aviators onto a single target.

During the first six months of the war Japanese naval air power achieved spectacular success and spearheaded offensive operations against Allied forces. On 7 December 1941, the IJN's Kido Butai attacked Pearl Harbor, crippling the U.S Pacific Fleet by destroying over 188 aircraft at the cost of 29 aircraft. On 10 December, Japanese naval land based bombers operating from bases in Indochina, were also responsible for the sinkings of HMS Prince of Wales and HMS Repulse which was the first time that capital ships were sunk by aerial attack while underway. In April 1942, the Indian Ocean raid drove the Royal Navy from South East Asia. There were also air raids carried out on the Philippines and Darwin in northern Australia.

In these battles, the Japanese veterans of the Chinese war did well against inexperienced Allied pilots flying obsolete aircraft. However, their advantage did not last. In the Battle of the Coral Sea, the Battle of Midway, and again in the Guadalcanal Campaign, the Japanese lost many veteran pilots. Because the Japanese pilot training program was unable to increase its production rate, those veterans could not be replaced. Meanwhile, the American pilot training program went from strength to strength. The American aircraft industry rapidly increased production rates of new designs that rendered their Japanese opponents obsolescent. Examination of crashed or captured Japanese aircraft revealed that they achieved their superior range and maneuverability by doing without cockpit armor and self-sealing fuel tanks. Flight tests showed that they lost maneuverability at high speeds. American pilots were trained to take advantage of these weaknesses. The outdated Japanese aircraft and poorly trained pilots suffered great losses in any air combat for the rest of the war, particularly in the Battle of the Philippine Sea. In the Battle of Leyte Gulf a few months later, the First Air Fleet was used only as a decoy force to draw the main American fleet away from Leyte. The remnants of Japanese naval aviation were then limited to land-based operations, increasingly characterized by kamikaze attacks on American invasion fleets.

From 16 December 1941 to 20 March 1945 IJN aviation casualties killed were 14,242 aircrew and 1,579 officers.

Aircraft strength 1941

The IJNAS had over 3,089 aircraft in 1941 and 370 trainers.
 1,830 first-line aircraft including:
 660 fighters, including 350 Mitsubishi Zeros
 330 carrier-based strike aircraft
 240 land-based, twin-engined bombers
 520 seaplanes (includes fighters and reconnaissance) and flying boats.

Organization

The elite of the pilots were the carrier-based air groups (Kōkūtai, later called koku sentai) whose size (from a handful to 80 or 90 aircraft) was dependent on both the mission and type of aircraft carrier that they were on. Fleet carriers had three types of aircraft: fighters, level/torpedo planes, and dive bombers. Smaller carriers tended to have only two types, fighters and level/torpedo planes. The carrier-based Kōkūtai numbered over 1,500 pilots and just as many aircraft at the beginning of the Pacific War. The IJN also maintained a shore-based system of naval air fleets called Koku Kantai and area air fleets called homen kantai containing mostly twin-engine bombers and seaplanes. The senior command was the Eleventh Naval Air Fleet, commanded by Vice Admiral Nishizō Tsukahara. Land based aircraft provided the bulk of Japan's naval aviation up to the eve of World War II.

Each naval air fleet contained one or more naval air flotillas (commanded by Rear Admirals) each with two or more naval air groups. Each naval air group consisted of a base unit and 12 to 36 aircraft, plus four to 12 aircraft in reserve. Each hikotai was commanded by a Lieutenant (j.g.), Warrant Officer, or experienced Chief Petty Officer, while most pilots were non-commissioned officers. There were usually four sections in each hikotai, each  with three or four aircraft; by mid-1944 it was common for a shotai to have four aircraft. There were over 90 naval air groups at the start of the Pacific War, each assigned either a name or a number. The named naval air groups were usually linked to a particular navy air command or a navy base. They were usually numbered when they left Japan.

See also
 List of military aircraft of Japan
 Pilot training in the Imperial Japanese Navy
 Imperial Japanese Navy Aviation Bureau
 Imperial Japanese Army Air Service
 List of A6M Reisen operators
 List of Japanese Navy Air Force aces (Mitsubishi A6M)
 Daitai Transport Unit
 List of radar models of the Imperial Japanese Navy
 List of bombs used by the Imperial Japanese Navy
 List of weapons on Japanese combat aircraft
 List of Aircraft engines in use of Japanese Navy Air Force
 Japanese marine paratroopers of World War II
 WWII Battle of Japan (Air War)

References

Notes

Citations

Bibliography

Further reading
 Francillon, Ph.D., René J. Japanese Aircraft of the Pacific War. London: Putnam & Company Ltd., 1970.  (2nd edition 1979).
 Gilbert, Martin (ed.). Illustrated London News: Marching to War, 1933–1939. New York: Doubleday, 1989.
 Thorpe, Donald W. Japanese Naval Air Force Camouflage and Markings World War II. Fallbrook, CA: Aero Publishers, Inc., 1977.  (hardcover, paperback ).
 Tagaya, Osamu: "The Imperial Japanese Air Forces", In: Higham & Harris. Why Air Forces Fail: The Anatomy of Defeat. University Press of Kentucky
 Sweet creative (ed.). Zerosen no himitsu. PHP kenkyusho, 2009. .
Assignment of naval air group numbers (海軍航空隊番号附与標準, Kaigun Kōkūtai-bangō fuyo Hyōjun), 1 November 1942, Naval Minister's Secretariat, Ministry of the Navy
 Senshi Sōsho, Asagumo Simbun (Japan)
 Vol. 39, Combined Fleet #4, "First part of the Third step Operations", 1970
 Vol. 45, Combined Fleet #6, "Latter part of the Third step Operations", 1971
 Vol. 71, Combined Fleet #5, "Middle part of the Third step Operations", 1974
 Vol. 77, Combined Fleet #3, "Until February 1943", 1974
 Vol. 80, Combined Fleet #2, "Until June 1942", 1975
 Vol. 91, Combined Fleet #1, "Until outbreak of war", 1975
 Vol. 93, Combined Fleet #7, "Last part of the War", 1976
 Vol. 95, History and summary of the Imperial Japanese Navy Air Service, 1976

External links
 http://www.combinedfleet.com/kaigun.htm (see the section of Japanese Navy Aircraft)
 http://www.warbirdpix.com/ (link with somes photos of Axis Aircraft (German, Italian and Japanese Army and Navy)
 http://www.j-aircraft.org/xplanes/ (about advanced Japanese Army and Navy aircraft)
 https://web.archive.org/web/20091027182301/http://uk.geocities.com/sadakichi09/ (over Japanese Navy and Army armaments, vehicles, Aircraft, electronic warfare and somes local special Japanese weapon technology )
 http://www.j-aircraft.com/captured/ (somes captured aircraft or aircraft in evaluations)
 http://www.j-aircraft.com/ (general resources of Japanese aircraft)

 
Japanese naval aviators
Imperial Japanese Navy
Japanese Air Force
Disbanded air forces
Naval history of World War II
Aviation history of Japan